STED may refer to:

 STED microscopy (stimulated emission depletion)
 STED sewer (septic tank effluent drainage)
 Septic tank effluent rainage system, a type of Sanitary sewer

See also
 Stead (disambiguation)